The 1982 Yukon general election was held on June 7, 1982 to elect members of the 25th Legislative Assembly of the territory of Yukon, Canada. It was won by the Progressive Conservatives.

Results by Party

|- style="background:#ccc;"
! rowspan="2" colspan="2" style="text-align:left;"|Party
! rowspan="2" style="text-align:left;"|Party leader
!rowspan="2"|Candidates
! colspan="4" style="text-align:center;"|Seats
!colspan="3" style="text-align:center;"|Popular vote
|- style="background:#ccc;"
| style="text-align:center;"|1978
| style="text-align:center;font-size: 80%;"|Dissol.
| style="text-align:center;"|1982
| style="text-align:center;"|Change
| style="text-align:center;"|#
| style="text-align:center;"|%
| style="text-align:center;"|Change

|align=left|Chris Pearson
|align="right"|16
|align="right"|11
|align="right"|10
|align="right"|10
|align="right"|-1
|align="right"|4,770
|align="right"|45.79%
|align="right"|+8.69%

|align=left|Tony Penikett
|align="right"|16
|align="right"|1
|align="right"|3
|align="right"|6
|align="right"|+5
|align="right"|3,689
|align="right"|35.42%
|align="right"|+15.15%

|align=left|Ron Veale
|align="right"|15
|align="right"|2
|align="right"|2
|align="right"|0
|align="right"|-2
|align="right"|1,564
|align="right"|15.02%
|align="right"|-13.44%

| colspan="2" style="text-align:left;"|Independent
|align="right"|4
|align="right"|2
|align="right"|1
|align="right"|0
|align="right"|-2
|align="right"|393
|align="right"|3.77%
|align="right"|N/A
|-
| style="text-align:left;" colspan="3"|Total
| style="text-align:right;"|51
| style="text-align:right;"|16
| style="text-align:right;"|16
| style="text-align:right;"|16
| style="text-align:right;"|
| style="text-align:right;"|10,416
| style="text-align:right;"|100.00%
| style="text-align:right;"|
|}

Member Changes from Previous Election

The New Democratic Party forms Official Opposition, following Whitehorse South Centre by-election.

Incumbents not Running for Reelection
The following MLAs had announced that they would not be running in the 1982 election:

Progressive Conservative
Doug Graham (Whitehorse Porter Creek West)
Meg McCall (Klondike)

Results by Riding
Bold indicates party leaders
† - denotes a retiring incumbent MLA

|-
| style="background:whitesmoke;"|Campbell
|
|Robert Fleming214
|
|Bill Webber43
||
|Dave Porter225
|
|
||
|Robert Fleming
|-
| style="background:whitesmoke;"|Faro
|
|Doris Gates205
|
|Wayne Peace160
||
|Maurice Byblow357
|
|
||
|Maurice Byblow
|-
| style="background:whitesmoke;"|Hootalinqua
||
|Al Falle368
|
|Patrick James92
|
|Max Fraser344
|
|
||
|Al Falle
|-
| style="background:whitesmoke;"|Klondike
||
|Clarke Ashley306
|
|
|
|Art Webster283
|
|
||
|Meg McCall†
|-
| style="background:whitesmoke;"|Kluane
||
|Bill Brewster241
|
|Alice McGuire16
|
|Dave Joe196
|
|
||
|Alice McGuire
|-
| style="background:whitesmoke;"|Mayo
|
|Swede Hanson173
|
|Eleanor Van Bibber35
||
|Piers McDonald230
|
|
||
|Swede Hanson
|-
| style="background:whitesmoke;"|Old Crow
||
|Kathie Nukon59
|
|Abraham Peter29
|
|Bruce Charlie35
|
|Grafton Njootli11
||
|Grafton Njootli
|-
| style="background:whitesmoke;"|Tatchun 
||
|Howard Tracey106
|
|Roger Coles103
|
|Bill Larson101
|
|
||
|Howard Tracey
|-
| style="background:whitesmoke;"|Watson Lake
|
|Dave Rollie142
|
|Eileen Van Bibber60
|
|James Cahill18
||
|Don Taylor170Brian Shanahan154
||
|Don Taylor
|-
| style="background:whitesmoke;"|Whitehorse North Centre
|
|Geoff Lattin227
|
|Bert Hadvick65
||
|Margaret Commodore292
|
|Don Branigan58
||
|Geoff Lattin
|-
| style="background:whitesmoke;"|Whitehorse Porter Creek East
||
|Dan Lang645
|
|Betty Toews92
|
|Gerry Dobson240
|
|
||
|Dan Lang
|-
| style="background:whitesmoke;"|Whitehorse Porter Creek West
||
|Andy Philipsen299
|
|Lawrence Whelan45
|
|David Cosco119
|
|
||
|Doug Graham†
|-
| style="background:whitesmoke;"|Whitehorse Riverdale North
||
|Chris Pearson395
|
|Jim Kennelly188
|
|Velma Smith148
|
|
||
|Chris Pearson
|-
| style="background:whitesmoke;"|Whitehorse Riverdale South
||
|Bea Firth562
|
|Ron Veale469
|
|Jon Pierce232
|
|
||
|Ron Veale
|-
| style="background:whitesmoke;"|Whitehorse South Centre
|
|Chuck Rear320
|
|Carol Christian108
||
|Roger Kimmerly328
|
|
||
|Roger Kimmerly
|-
| style="background:whitesmoke;"|Whitehorse West
|
|Pat Harvey508
|
|Adam Skrutkowski59
||
|Tony Penikett541
|
|
||
|Tony Penikett
|}

References

Elections in Yukon
Yukon
1982 in Yukon
June 1982 events in Canada